Byline Bank is a bank headquartered in Chicago, Illinois, United States. It is the primary subsidiary of Byline Bancorp, Inc., a bank holding company. , it operated 57 branches, 56 of which were in the Chicago metropolitan area. It is the 4th largest Small Business Administration lender.

History
The company was founded in 1978 by the Fasseas family as Metropolitan Bank Group after the purchase of North Community Bank.

The family grew the bank from a single location to more than 90 branches in the Chicago metropolitan area before suffering in the financial crisis of 2007-08.

In 2009, the company accepted $71.5 million from the Troubled Asset Relief Program.

In 2013, BXM Holdings LLC, led by Roberto Herencia, purchased and recapitalized the bank with a $207 million investment.

In 2015, the company was renamed Byline Bancorp Inc. and consolidated all its subsidiaries under the name Byline Bank.

In 2016, the company acquired Ridgestone Bank.

In June 2017, the company became a public company via an initial public offering.

In May 2018, the company acquired First Evanston Bancorp for $178.6 million in cash and stock.

In April 2019, the company acquired Oak Park River Forest Bank shares for $40.0 million in cash and stock.

In December 2022, Byline entered merger agreement and acquired Inland Bank valued at approximately $165 million in cash and stock.

References

External links
 

1978 establishments in Illinois
2017 initial public offerings
American companies established in 1978
Banks established in 1978
Banks based in Chicago
Companies listed on the New York Stock Exchange